Curator: The Museum Journal is a quarterly peer-reviewed academic journal published by Wiley-Blackwell.

The journal was established in 1958. Its editor-in-chief is Zahava D. Doering (Smithsonian Institution). The journal covers museum administration, research, exhibition development, visitor studies, conservation, museum education, collection management, and other subjects of current concern to museum professionals. It is abstracted and indexed in CSA ARTbibliographies Modern.

References

External links
 

Museology journals
English-language journals
Wiley-Blackwell academic journals
California Academy of Sciences
Publications established in 1958
1958 establishments in California